Liberty Presbyterian Church is a historic church on North Church Street in Liberty, Mississippi.

It was built in 1850, and added to the National Register of Historic Places in 1985. The current pastor of the church is Walt Gaston.

References

Presbyterian churches in Mississippi
Churches on the National Register of Historic Places in Mississippi
Greek Revival church buildings in Mississippi
Churches completed in 1850
19th-century Presbyterian church buildings in the United States
National Register of Historic Places in Amite County, Mississippi